Nineteenth-Century French Studies is a biannual peer-reviewed academic journal covering nineteenth-century French literature and related fields. It is published in English and French by the University of Nebraska Press. The journal publishes book reviews online. It is abstracted and indexed by Scopus, Arts & Humanities Citation Index, and Current Contents/Arts & Humanities. In January 2017, the journal received the 2016 Phoenix Award for Significant Editorial Achievement from the Council of Editors of Learned Journals

Editors-in-chief 
The editor-in-chief is Seth Whidden (The Queen's College, Oxford). Past editors have been Thomas H. Goetz (State University of New York at Fredonia, 1972-1999) and Marshall C. Olds (University of Nebraska, Michigan State University, 1999-2014).

References

External links 
 
 Nineteenth-Century French Studies at SCImago

19th-century French literature
Literary magazines published in the United States
Biannual journals
Publications established in 1972
Multilingual journals
Academic journals published by university presses